Quemadmodum is an encyclical of Pope Pius XII pleading for the care of the world's destitute children after World War II,  given at St. Peter's, Rome, on 6 January, Feast of the Epiphany, in 1946, the seventh of his Pontificate.

The Pope points out that during World War II, he spent all his powers of persuasion to end the conflict and to secure a peace based on justice, equity and right. As the war has ended, he leaves nothing undone to provide relief to several war-torn nations. 

There are millions of innocent children in many countries without the basic necessities of life, suffering from cold, hunger and disease. The Pontiff and his aid organizations helped many of them,  but his help has been inadequate  to the immense task. He therefore turns to the bishops of the world  asking for additional assistance and relief.

 We almost seem to see with Our own eyes the vast hosts of children weakened or at death's door through starvation. They hold out their little hands asking for bread "and there is no one to break it unto them" Without home, without clothing, they shiver in the winter cold and die. And there are no fathers or mothers to warm and clothe them. Ailing, or even in the last stages of consumption, they are without the necessary medicines and medical care. We see them, too, passing before Our sorrowful gaze, wandering through the noisy city street, reduced to unemployment and moral corruption, or drifting as vagrants uncertainly about the cities, the towns, the countryside, while no one - alas - provides safe refuge for them against want, vice and crime.

The Pope orders, that in  each Catholic  dioceses,  a day of public prayers must be assigned  to admonish the faithful of this urgent need and exhort them to support by their prayers, good works and offerings for  needy and abandoned children. "Amen I say to you, as long as you did it for one of these, the least of my brethren, you did it for me" (Matt. 25, 40).

The Pontiff points out that these children will be pillars of the next generation and therefore  it is essential that they grow up healthy in mind and body. Nobody should hesitate, then, to contribute time and money to a cause so opportune and essential. The  less wealthy should give what they can with open hand and willing heart. Those who live in luxury should reflect and remember that the indigence, hunger and nakedness of these children will constitute a grave and severe indictment of them before God. All should be convinced that their liberality will not be loss but gain.  One who gives  to the poor is lending to God Who, in His own time, will repay his generosity with abundant interest.
	
 The Church looks after infants and children following the lead of her Founder. While she exercises all possible care to see that they be provided with food, shelter and clothing for their bodies, she does not ignore or neglect their souls which - born, so to speak, from the breath of God - seem to portray the radiant beauty of Heaven.

References 

Encyclicals of Pope Pius XII
1946 in Christianity
January 1946 events